Castleton station is an Amtrak intercity train station in Castleton, Vermont. Originally built by the Rutland and Whitehall Railroad in 1850, the depot is now privately owned, and is located across from the northern terminus of the Delaware and Hudson Rail Trail. Castleton replaced Fair Haven station on the Ethan Allen Express in January 2010. It serves nearby Castleton University and Lake Bomoseen.

The station has one short low-level wooden side platform to the east of the track.

History 

The station building was constructed in 1850. Passenger service on the line between Whitehall and Rutland ended on June 24, 1934. In 1966, the Delaware and Hudson Railroad sold the station to the Jakubowski family.

The Ethan Allen Express began service between New York City and Rutland on December 2, 1996. An infill station was opened at Fair Haven in November 1997.

Fair Haven is a small town with limited tourist activity; in FY 2007 the station served just 2,205 passengers. In 2005, the Jakubowski family began renovating Castleton station. In January 2010, Fair Haven station was replaced with Castleton,  to the east, which better serves Castleton University and Lake Bomoseen. Castleton station opened on January 2; Fair Haven remained in use until January 9.

Accessibility improvements at the station, including a new platform, took place in 2016–2018. From March 2020 to July 19, 2021, all Amtrak service in Vermont was suspended in response to the COVID-19 pandemic, with the Ethan Allen Express truncated to Albany–Rensselaer station.

References

External links 

Amtrak stations in Vermont
Former Delaware and Hudson Railway stations
Buildings and structures in Castleton, Vermont
Railway stations in the United States opened in 1850
Transportation buildings and structures in Rutland County, Vermont